Women's Combined World Cup 1989/1990

Calendar

Final point standings

In Women's Combined World Cup 1989/90 both results count.

References

External links
 

World Cup
FIS Alpine Ski World Cup women's combined discipline titles